Hartog v Colin & Shields [1939] 3 All ER 566 is an important English contract law case regarding unilateral mistake. It holds that when it is obvious that someone has made a mistake in the terms of an offer, one may not simply "snap up" the offer and be able to enforce the agreement.

Facts

The defendants, Colin & Shields, were London hide merchants. Mr Louis-Levie Hartog was a Belgian furrier, living in Brussels. Colin & Shields discussed and verbally agreed to sell 30,000 Argentinian hare skins at “10d per skin” (which would have come to £1,250) to Mr Hartog. When the firm the final offer in writing it mistakenly wrote “10,000 skins at 10d per lb” and the other 20,000 lesser skins similarly per lb (imperial pound), not in the standard unit in the industry of per unit (per piece, that is per skin or half skin). As hare skins average around 5oz, this was ths of the price discussed and orally agreed upon.

Mr Hartog tried to hold them to this very good written offer. He claimed loss of profit, or, in the alternative, the difference between the contract price and the market price at the time of the breach. Colin & Shields pleaded that their offer was by mistake wrongly expressed. They plead that they had still intended to offer the goods per piece, and not per (imperial) pound. They argued Hartog was well aware of this mistake and fraudulently accepted an offer which he well knew that the defendants had never intended to make. In the circumstances, they denied that any binding contract was entered into, and, if there was, would counterclaim against its enforcement, for its rescission.

Judgment
The judge found in Colin & Shields’ favour on the grounds that the plaintiff must have realised the defendants’ error, which, as it concerned a term of the contract, rendered the contract void. Singleton J read the following judgment.

See also
Tamplin v James (1880) 15 Ch D 215, applied in that specific performance would not be available given this would amount to clear "injustice"
Smith v Hughes (1871) LT 6 QB 597, distinguished
The Moorcock (1889) 14 PD 64, applied in that the law will imply (contract) such terms as are "obvious and necessary" (not those merely "desirable and reasonable") such as always included or implicit in a particular course of trade.

Notes

1939 in case law
English agreement case law
English mistake case law
High Court of Justice cases
1939 in British law